EV-1 or ev1 or variation, may refer to:

Automobiles
 General Motors EV1, an electric car introduced in 1996 and discontinued in 1999
 Saab EV-1, developed by Saab in 1985 as a future design study
 Kawei EV1, a Chinese electric SUV
 Daihatsu EV1, a concept car for the 1973 Tokyo Motor Show

Other uses
 EV1 The Atlantic Coast Route, a long-distance cycling route in Europe
 EV1 Servers, an Internet hosting service
 NOTS-EV-1 Pilot, the EV-1 model called Pilot from NOTS, a missile and launch vehicle rocket
 Extra-vehicular (no.), a NASA designation for spacewalkers (EV-1 is one of four designations)

See also

 
 
 
 
 EV (disambiguation)
 EVI (disambiguation)
 EVL (disambiguation)